Waldaschaff is a community in the Aschaffenburg district in the Regierungsbezirk of Lower Franconia (Unterfranken) in Bavaria, Germany.

Geography

Location
The community lies at the threshold of the High Spessart (range), roughly 15 km from Aschaffenburg and roughly 65 km from Frankfurt am Main. Like many villages in this part of the country, Waldaschaff is a linear settlement, following a road. Around the village are found the woodlands of the Spessart Nature Park (Naturpark Spessart) and 2km to the north west, the Steinknückl peak.

History

Recent history
The community's upswing and development into modernity are closely linked with mayor Herbert Brehm's name. Important projects during his mayoralty were things such as opening up building development areas like Breite Wiese, dredging the Aschaff for flood control, and laying down requirements for further development at the YMOS metalworks which were then being operated in the community, employing more than a thousand workers. Further businesses such as the drinks industry and tourism managed to blossom. Substantial infrastructure projects in waterworks and sewage and transport links were undertaken and successfully completed. The sport centre and the gymnasium came into being and were put into a developmental context with the Ebets building development area. In the zoning plan that was put forth, Brehm introduced the ideas for the Ebets building development area and the Heerbach commercial area, thereby laying decisive guidelines down, until his very early death, for the village's future development. Today, the community administration's eyes have been cast upon renewing the village's core. To this end, a consortium was formed. In 2006, the Ebets-Rodwiesen building development area had been fully opened up.

Economy

Established businesses
The best known businesses in Waldaschaff are WAGON Automotive, a car supplier, and Bayerisches Münzkontor, a mail order business specializing in collectibles. Also, many smaller companies have settled here owing to its favourable location.

Government

Community council

The council is made up of 16 council members.

Elections in 2020:
CSU: 9 seats
SPD: 7 seats

Mayors
 1966–1984: Herbert Brehm (SPD)
 1984–2003: Peter Winter (CSU)
 since 2003: Marcus Grimm (CSU)

Town twinning
 Clonakilty, County Cork, Ireland

Coat of arms
The community's arms might be described thus: Gules a bend wavy argent surmounted by an oakleaf in bend vert, the stem to base, in chief a wheel of the second spoked of six, in base a cogwheel of the second.

The six-spoked silver wheel in red – the Wheel of Mainz – was the arms borne by the Archbishopric of Mainz, to which the community historically belonged until 1803. The wavy bend (slanted stripe) and the oakleaf stand for the community's location on the Aschaff in the Spessart forest, which has a wealth of oaktrees. Both the river and the forest (Wald in German) are parts of the community's name. The cogwheel symbolizes the industry that has sprung up in modern times, making it an important industrial location.

The arms have been borne since 21 August 1968.

Infrastructure

Emergency services
The Waldaschaff fire brigade was founded in 1873 as a volunteer firefighting service. Until the 1950s, the Waldaschaff fire brigade's main task was fighting fires, until technical assistance, for instance on the Autobahn, came to the fore. Along with this came changes to the fire brigade's fleet, so that the Waldaschaff fire brigade now keeps 11 vehicles and three trailers, two of which are traffic safety trailers. The fleet also features various special vehicles like a turntable ladder and a lighting mast van.

The fire brigade's service area comprises the Autobahn (BAB 3) as far as Marktheidenfeld on the way to Würzburg, and in the other direction to the boundary with Hesse. Furthermore, the fire brigade is also tied into various emergency alert plans of the other district emergency services. It also claims a high figure of 200 to 300 operations each year, two thirds of which are “performances of technical assistance”, and the rest are shared between firefighting and guarding duties.

At the turn of the millennium, the Waldaschaff fire brigade founded the “First-Responder” (so-called even in German) group (FR). The FR group's job is, with qualified aid workers, to bridge the gap between the onset of an emergency and the arrival of the first emergency service vehicle. Its service area is the Waldaschaff area, although in exceptional circumstances it may be driven outside the area.

Transport
In the 2000s the community became known for a citizens’ initiative to move the Autobahn A 3 further away from the village. Waldaschaff lies right on this Autobahn and experienced – according to the citizens’ initiative – a great deal of harm from noise and exhaust, not least of all from the Kauppenbrücke, a long highway bridge over the community – one of the longest on this stretch of the Autobahn. The highway has now been relocated to the south and the old Kauppenbrücke was torn down.

References

Aschaffenburg (district)